Sooryavamsham is a 1975 Indian Malayalam film,  directed by A. B. Raj and produced by Dos and Joy. The film stars Prem Nazir, Jayabharathi, Adoor Bhasi and Jose Prakash in the lead roles. The film has musical score by M. K. Arjunan.

Cast

Prem Nazir
Jayabharathi
Adoor Bhasi
Jose Prakash
T. R. Omana
Baby Sumathi
Bahadoor
Bheeman Raghu
Rajakokila

Soundtrack
The music was composed by M. K. Arjunan and the lyrics were written by Vayalar.

References

External links
 

1975 films
1970s Malayalam-language films
Films directed by A. B. Raj